Heterodera hordecalis is a plant pathogenic nematode affecting barley.

See also 
 List of oat diseases

References

External links 
 Nemaplex, University of California - Heterodera hordecalis

hordecalis
Plant pathogenic nematodes
Oats diseases